Zacharias Matheus Johannes 'Gysie' Pienaar  (born 21 December 1954 in Bloemfontein, South Africa) is a former South African rugby union player.

Playing career

Pienaar played for the Free State and the Springboks. He made his test debut against the visiting South American Jaguars team on 3 May 1980 as a replacement in the second half for Pierre Edwards. His first starting cap for the Springboks was on 31 May 1980 at Newlands in Cape Town against the touring British and Irish Lions team captained by Bill Beaumont.

Pienaar was capped 13 times for the Springboks, scored 2 tries and converted two penalty goals for a total of 14 test points.

Test history

Accolades
Pienaar was named the SA Rugby player of the Year for 1980.

Personal
Pienaar is the father of Ruan Pienaar, a professional rugby player and former Springbok.

See also
List of South Africa national rugby union players – Springbok no. 506

References

1954 births
Living people
South African rugby union players
South Africa international rugby union players
Free State Cheetahs players
Rugby union players from Bloemfontein
Rugby union fullbacks